Afghanistan National Standards Authority (ANSA) is an authority under the framework of the Ministry of Commerce and Industry. Mullah Faizullah Akhund is the current acting head of the authority.

References

External links
 - official website
International standards organizations
Government agencies in Afghanistan